Miroslav Hák (9 May 1911, in Nová Paka, Bohemia – 29  June 1978, in Prague) was a Czechoslovak photographer. He was one of the members of Group 42.

Miroslav Hak was one of the most outstanding figures in the history of Czech modern photography and ranked among the innerly rich and actually never fully recognized and recognizable personalities in the sphere of art. He studied under his father, the photographer František Hák. Between 1925 and 1931 Hák worked as a photographer in Prague on publications including Pestrý týden and in Bratislava.

In 1937 he joined the avant-garde D34 Theatre of Prague as a photographer and from 1940  he worked in the film industry.

Between 1942 and 1948 Miroslav Hák associated with the Prague-based Group 42, which united avant-garde Czech photographers. From 1954 he served as a photographer at the Institute of Art Theory and History of the Czechoslovak Academy of Sciences.

References

Bibliography
Jan Kříže: Miroslav Hák, Pressfoto, Praha 1981, Evid. číslo: 31238-6257
Jiří Kolář: Miroslav Hák, fotografie z let 1940–1958, edice Umělecké fotografie, svazek 2, SNKLHU, Praha, 1959

External links
ARTMUZEUM.cz  Miroslav Hák
Miroslav Hák Exhibition Letohrádek Portheimka, Prague, 28.09.2011

1911 births
1978 deaths
Czechoslovak photographers
Portrait photographers
Group 42
People from Nová Paka